Trinity Gaels is a Gaelic Athletic Association club based in Donaghmede in Dublin, Ireland. Trinity Gaels were founded in 1975 to cater for the growing population in the Donaghmede area. The club got their name from the local Roman Catholic parish name, the parish of the Holy Trinity. Gaels won the Dublin Intermediate Football Championship in 1994 and therefore qualified to senior status. For the past few seasons Gaels have been playing in Division 1 of the league. Trinity Gaels played in Fr Collins Park, Hole in the Wall Road, until the middle of the 2006 season when they moved to new purpose-built grounds including clubhouse and floodlit pitches on Drumnigh Road. A book entitled "Trinity Gaels – a look back through the last years", was launched at the Hilton Hotel, Malahide Road on 15 January 2007 to celebrate 30 years of the club's existence.

Honours
 1982 National Hurling Feile title
 1986 Dublin Minor Football League Division One winners
 1988 Dublin Junior Football Championship winners
 1994 Dublin Intermediate Football Championship winners
 1994 Dublin Junior Hurling Championship winners
 1994 Dublin Intermediate Camogie Championship winners
 1995 Dublin Intermediate Hurling League and Dublin Intermediate Hurling Championship double
 1999 Dublin AFL Division 2: winners
 2007 Dublin AFL Div. 8 Winners & Murphy Cup Winners
 2008 Dublin AFL Div. 7 Winners & Murphy Cup winners
 2010 Division 6 Football Feile winners & Dublin Division 7 Football League
 2011 Dublin Division 8 football Feile winners
 2017 Dublin AFL Div. 4
 2017 Dublin Junior D Hurling Championship Winner

Notable players
Vinny Murphy, former All Star and All Ireland winner
Fergal Bradshaw, former minor intercounty player
Dean Kelly ,former Dublin senior footballer and all Ireland winner

External links
Official Club Website
Dublin Club GAA
Dublin GAA
Trinity Gaels Info

Gaelic games clubs in Dublin (city)
Gaelic football clubs in Dublin (city)
Donaghmede